The HTC Advantage X7500 or HTC Athena  is a Windows Mobile 5.0 Pocket PC Phone Edition based smartphone designed and manufactured by HTC. The Athena was sold by T-Mobile US under the name T-Mobile Ameo. The Ameo launched in Europe in March 2007. It was also sold under the Dopod brand as the Dopod U1000.

The HTC Advantage X7501 is the Windows Mobile 6.0 version released in July 2007 as an OEM unlocked GSM phone by CompUSA and Amazon.com primarily for the North American market as a Pocket PC. It does not have the second camera which the Advantage X7500 has for videoconferencing.

The HTC Advantage X7510 is an updated version of the X7500, featuring Windows Mobile 6.1 "Manilla" Professional and solid state, 16GB flash drive. The X7510 model also brings back the secondary VGA camera on the screen side for videoconferencing.

Specifications 

A full specifications sheet was leaked on January 26, 2007.

References

External links 
HTC Advantage X7500, X7501, X7510 (archive)
HTC Advantage X7501 (archive)
HTC Source: a news blog dedicated to HTC devices
Official HTC wiki site (archive)
HTC Athena (Wiki) from forum.xda-developers.com/wiki

Mobile phones introduced in 2007
HTC smartphones
Windows Mobile Professional devices
Mobile phones with user-replaceable battery